Synodontis vermiculatus is a species of upside-down catfish native to the Niger basin of Guinea, Mali, Niger and Nigeria.  This species grows to a length of  SL.

References

External links 

vermiculatus
Freshwater fish of West Africa
Taxa named by Jacques Daget
Fish described in 1954